The Hillsborough City School District is a public school district in Hillsborough, California, United States. Currently, the district serves over 1530 students who live in the town of Hillsborough.

History
In 1850, Hillsborough opened its first classroom within George Howard's home to educate six enrolled students.  In 1917, South Hillsborough School was built to serve students within grades K–8. It serves the whole town as the only middle school. It currently enrolls about 550 students in grades sixth, seventh and eighth. North and West Hillsborough Schools were built in the early 1950s to accommodate the growth within the town.  William H. Crocker Middle School opened in 1959.  After the passage of the Measure B bond in 2002, each of the Hillsborough schools were renovated and modernized.

Schools
There are four schools within the Hillsborough City School District: three elementary schools and one middle school. 
William H. Crocker Middle School
North Hillsborough Elementary School
South Hillsborough Elementary School
West Hillsborough Elementary School

References

External links
 

School districts in San Mateo County, California
1850 establishments in California
School districts established in 1850